Alfred Lubbock (31 October 1845 – 17 July 1916) was an English insurance underwriter and banker. He is best known as an amateur cricketer who played first-class cricket for a variety of sides including Kent County Cricket Club and the Marylebone Cricket Club between 1863 and 1875. He was considered to be one of the best batsman of his era, comparable to WG Grace, and also played association football, playing for Old Etonians in the 1875 FA Cup Final.

Early life
Lubbock was born in London in 1845, the seventh son of Sir John Lubbock. One of 15 children of Sir John and his wife Lady Harriet Lubbock, he was educated at Eton College. Lubbock was a fine sportsman, playing lawn tennis and excelling at the Eton wall game as well as playing cricket, captaining the school team in 1863. In his Wisden obituary Sydney Pardon argued that, given the relatively low scoring nature of cricket in the 1860s, Lubbock had a claim to have had one of the best season's batting for the school, including making a score of 174 not out against Winchester College in 1863.

Cricket career
Lubbock made his first-class cricket debut for Kent County Cricket Club during Canterbury Cricket Week in 1863, playing against an England side. He played a total of 28 first-class matches for a variety of teams, including Gentlemen of Kent and MCC, until "practically giving up" first-class cricket before the age of 28 in 1871. He played eight times in Gentlemen v Players matches and scored two centuries, one for the Gentlemen and one, his highest score of 129, for an England XI in 1867. Pardon was of the opinion that if Test cricket had existed at the time Lubbock played that "he would have had every right to play for England" in his best seasons.

Lubbock appeared in only one county cricket match, his final first-class game at Catford in 1875 and ost of his cricket at this level was played during Canterbury Week or for the Gentlemen in more social environments. In club cricket Lubbock played for a wide variety of sides, including Eton Ramblers, of which he was a founder with seven others in 1862, the Gentlemen of West Kent, Band of Brothers and I Zingari. He scored "hundreds of runs", including a score of 200 against Royal Engineers in 1866 but chose to play relatively little first-class cricket. Pardon believed him to have been "one of the greatest batsmen" of his era who had "threatened to be WG Grace's most formidable rival".

Football
Lubbock also played football and appeared for Old Etonians in the replay of the 1875 FA Cup Final against the Royal Engineers, one of the dominant teams of the day. The first match had finished 1–1, but several Old Etonians were unable to play in the replay at The Oval and Lubbock was called in as a replacement. He finished on the losing side, Royal Engineers winning 2–0.

Family and later life
Two of Lubbock's brothers, Nevile and Edgar also played some first-class cricket for Kent and most of his brothers played cricket for the Gentlemen of West Kent at some point. Edgar played in the 1875 FA Cup Final replay alongside Alfred for Old Etonians, the first time that two brothers had appeared on the same side in an FA Cup Final. His oldest brother, John, became the first Baron Avebury in 1900.

He is the author of Memories of Eton and Etonians (1899).

Lubbock worked as an underwriter for Lloyd's of London and was a director of Robarts, Lubbock & Co, a private bank established in 1772 and owned by his family. He married Louisa Wallwroth in 1875. The couple had five children, including the author Basil Lubbock. He died at Killmarth Manor at Par, Cornwall in 1916 aged 70.

References

1845 births
1916 deaths
Association footballers not categorized by position
English cricketers
English footballers
FA Cup Final players
Gentlemen of Kent cricketers
Gentlemen of the South cricketers
I Zingari cricketers
Kent cricketers
Alfred
Marylebone Cricket Club cricketers
Non-international England cricketers
North of the Thames v South of the Thames cricketers
North v South cricketers
Old Etonians F.C. players
People educated at Eton College
Younger sons of baronets